After Love is an album by jazz pianist Dave Burrell, which was recorded in 1970 and released on the French America  label. It was reissued on CD in 2004 by Universal France. The two songs (on three tracks) were recorded during the "legendary Parisian sessions of 1969–1970". It was during this time period that such acts as the Art Ensemble of Chicago, Archie Shepp and others took up residence in Europe, specifically in Paris, France.

Track listing 
"After Love, Pt. 1 "Questions and Answers"" — 21:46
"After Love, Pt. 2 "Random"" — 7:06
"My March" — 22:03
Songs credited to Burrell.

Personnel 
Band:
Dave Burrell — piano
Bertrand Gauthier — drums
Michel Gladieux — double bass
Ron Miller — mandolin, double bass
Roscoe Mitchell — reeds
Don Moye — drums
Alan Silva — violin, cello, Electric cello

Production:
Martin Davies — English translations
Alexis Frenkel — mastering, transfers
Gilles Guerlet, Jérôme Witz — art direction, design, paintings
Bruno Guermonprez — reissue preparation
Horace, Christian Rose, Frederick L. Thomas — photography
Robert Levin — liner notes
Daniel Richard — reissue supervisor

Reception 
Allmusic comments that the album is "a compelling and provocative one." Reviewer Thom Jurek says that "what is immediately striking is the lack of the piano's sonic presence on the session" but that the Burrel is "everywhere ... going for something else ... [a] textural and harmonic interaction of the various stringed instruments as they encounter and dialogue with each other." The Penguin Guide to Jazz says that the album is similar to Burrell's earlier work of Echo “in that the first piece is fierce and intense, while the second majors on atmospherics." Still, they call the instrumentation fascinating and "this is a valuable reissue from an important period in the American improvisation diaspora."

References 

Dave Burrell albums
1971 albums
America Records albums